Swintonia pierrei is a tree species in the family Anacardiaceae. It is native to Cambodia and Vietnam.

References

pierrei
Flora of Cambodia
Flora of Vietnam